Ermin Bravo (born 5 December 1979) is a Bosnian actor. He has appeared in more than ten films since 2001. He is most known for starring in the 2003 Bosnian film Remake. Bravo is also remembered as a unique character in the 2017 film Men Don't Cry.

In 2017, he signed the Declaration on the Common Language of the Croats, Serbs, Bosniaks and Montenegrins.

Personal life 

Bravo dated Serbian actress Mirjana Karanović who is 22 years his senior.

Selected filmography

References

External links 

1979 births
Living people
Bosnia and Herzegovina male film actors
Signatories of the Declaration on the Common Language